Cyperus orthostachyus is a species of sedge that is native to temperate parts of Asia.

See also 
 List of Cyperus species

References 

orthostachyus
Plants described in 1878
Flora of China
Flora of Mongolia
Flora of Japan
Flora of Korea
Flora of Vietnam
Taxa named by Adrien René Franchet